The Coordinadora Democrática (Democratic Coordinator, CD) was an umbrella group of Venezuelan political parties and organisations opposed to President Hugo Chávez. Founded on 5 July 2002, it was involved in organising the Venezuelan general strike of 2002-2003 and the 2004 Venezuelan recall referendum. The group included a wide range of political parties and other actors, including the business federation Fedecámaras and the trade union federation Confederación de Trabajadores de Venezuela (CTV).

The CD was created in large part to enable the opposition to participate in the Organization of American States (OAS) "mesa" dialogue process (Mesa de Negociacion y Acuerdos) which followed the 2002 Venezuelan coup d'état attempt. "The opposition participated in the OAS-facilitated dialogue process as but one of several tracks in a multitrack strategy to oust the Chavez government. ... As long as the elements grouped together under the Coordinadora Democratica  continued their pursuit of street tactics, the mesa advanced little on its three-point agenda. Instead, it served during this period of heightened mobilization as a valuable communication link between two polarized sides that were otherwise not communicating."

After the February 2003 failure of the Venezuelan general strike of 2002-2003, the CD was much more willing to discuss the mesa's proposals, and pushed for a binding recall referendum under Article 72 of the Constitution of Venezuela, which was ultimately agreed on 23 May 2003. The CD rejected the outcome of the 2004 Venezuelan recall referendum, which saw 59% of the vote  for Chavez.

Parties 

 Acción Agropecuaria (AA)
 Acción Democrática (AD)
 Alianza Bravo Pueblo (ABP)
 Alianza por la Libertad (APL)
 Bandera Roja (BR)
 Convergencia
 Copei
 La Causa R (LCR)
 Movimiento al Socialismo (MAS)
 Movimiento de Integridad Nacional Unidad (MIN)
 Primero Justicia (PJ)
 Proyecto Venezuela (PV)
 Solidaridad
 Solidaridad Independiente (SI)
 Unión
 Unión Republicana Democrática (URD)
 Visión Emergente (VE)

Among the parties that joined later were:

 Democracia Renovadora (DR)
 Fuerza Liberal (FL)
 Movimiento Republicano (MR)
 Movimiento Trabajo (MT)
 Opinión Nacional (Opina)
 Movimiento Resistencia Civil (MRC)
 Un Nuevo Tiempo (UNT)
 Un Solo Pueblo (USP)

References

2002 establishments in Venezuela
Defunct political party alliances in Venezuela
Politics of Venezuela
Political organizations based in Venezuela
Opposition to Hugo Chávez